Joe Gray (born 5 August 1988) is a rugby union coach for London Scottish in the RFU Championship and a retired player. He played for Harlequins in Premiership Rugby across two spells. He is the only player in history to have won every trophy available to players in the top two tiers of English rugby, including both European trophies. He played as a hooker, and previously played for Northampton Saints and Saracens.

Career
Gray started his Rugby career at Nottingham, he was part of the Nottinghamshire County Schools Rugby Club and also played with Notts, Lincs & Derby County side. Gray took part in a tour of Australia with Three Counties at the age of 15. He played for England under16's A and played for the England under 18's the following year while he was still only 16.

Gray won the Churchill Cup with the England Saxons after starting the Challenge Cup final for Harlequins that they won in 2011.

He started for Harlequins in their 2011–12 Premiership final victory over Leicester Tigers. Following his 80 minutes in the final he toured with England that summer to South Africa and played in the two midweek uncapped games against the Barbarians.

On 27 January 2019, Gray faced his old club Harlequins in a Premiership Rugby Cup match, against Saracens. An away win for Saracens, in which Gray came on in the second half as hooker. He was a replacement as Saracens won the 2019 European Rugby Champions Cup Final. He returned to Harlequins on loan in January 2020 before signing full time with the club.

Gray won his second Premiership title, this time as a replacement, as Harlequins won the game 40-38 in the highest scoring Premiership final ever on 26 June 2021.

Gray got his first taste of club coaching with KCS Old Boys RFC in the 2015-16 season before going on to become the Director of Rugby at Barnes RFC.

Following his retirement from playing at the end of the 2021–22 season. He became head coach at London Scottish.

International career
Gray was called up again to the England training squad by coach Stuart Lancaster in May 2014 and flew out with the squad for the Barbarians' fixtures. He made his England debut during the tour, coming off the bench in the 20-15 loss to New Zealand.

References

External links
Harlequins profile

1988 births
Living people
England international rugby union players
English rugby union players
Harlequin F.C. players
Northampton Saints players
Rugby union hookers
Rugby union players from Nottingham
Saracens F.C. players